The Oaxaca alligator lizard (Barisia planifrons) is a species of medium-sized lizard in the family Anguidae. The species is endemic to Mexico.

References

Barisia
Reptiles of Mexico
Reptiles described in 1878
Taxa named by Marie Firmin Bocourt